Barbarella's was a nightclub and music venue located in Birmingham, England.  The name of the club was taken from the film Barbarella.  The club opened in 1972 and closed in
August 1979.

This club was one of Eddie Fewtrell's clubs. Fewtrell promoted known rock bands at that time, such as AC/DC, Dire Straits, Queen, Sex Pistols and The Clash.

Duran Duran's drummer Roger Taylor played at Barbarella's with punk bands in the 1970s.

Both The Prefects and The Photos recorded a song called Barbarella's, the latter mourning the closure of the club.

Notes

References

External links 
 
 

Music venues in Birmingham, West Midlands
Nightclubs in Birmingham, West Midlands